Maryann Ekeada (born 23 July 1979) is a Nigerian judoka who competed in the women's lightweight category. She won three medals at the African Judo Championships between 1997 and 2004.

Sports career
In 1997, at the 19th edition of the African Judo Championships held in Casablanca, Morocco, Maryann took part in the 56 kg event and won the bronze medal. At the 2001 African Judo Championships held in Tripoli, Libya, she also participated and earned her way to a silver medal but this time in the 63 kg event.

The 2004 African Judo Championships was held in Tunis, Tunisia and Maryann got the bronze medal also in the 63 kg event.

References

1979 births
Living people
Nigerian female judoka
African Games medalists in judo
Competitors at the 2003 All-Africa Games
African Games bronze medalists for Nigeria
20th-century Nigerian women
21st-century Nigerian women